The Chinese Taipei Hockey Association is the governing body of field hockey in Republic of China (Taiwan). It is affiliated to IHF International Hockey Federation and AHF Asian Hockey Federation. The headquarters of the federation are in Taipei.

Tsai Yi Chu is the President of the Chinese Taipei Hockey Association and Chih-Peng Wu is the Secretary.

See also
 Chinese Taipei men's national field hockey team
 Chinese Taipei women's national field hockey team

References

External links
 Chinese Taipei Hockey Association

Taiwan
Field Hockey
Field hockey in Taiwan